Bibi Khatun may refer to:

 Bibi Khatun, Bushehr, Iran
 Bibi Khatun, Kohgiluyeh and Boyer-Ahmad, Iran
 Bibi Jamal Khatun (died 1647), a Sindhi Sufi saint